Betsy Rosenberg, born in August 1955, served as a CBS Radio News anchor in New York City from April 1988 till mid-1991. After starting the "Trash Talk" eco series on KCBS Radio in San Francisco (CA) on Earth Day 1997, she later hosted EcoTalk on Air America Radio. The program was broadcast every weeknight from 9 to 10pm  Eastern Time. Its last program broadcast on 19 May 2007. Her new series, The Green Front, later aired on Progressive Radio Network, an internet radio station. Since summer 2021. she has been leading with Jon Lake an effort to start Green TV (US), enhancing its Web site (www.greentv.com), and striving toward launching an online streaming service for "all green news and views, all the time," eventually intended it to operate 24-7. She hopes to upgrade to a cable television channel eventually. She has conducted more than 4500 environmental interviews with climate scientists, climate activists, politicians, and thinkers.

History

Career
 KCBS reporter and anchor
 CBS Radio Network anchor

External links
 The Green Front, web page for new show
 On the Greenfront Rosenberg's blog
 Rosenberg's Facebook page

 http://www.greentv.com/aboutus 

American talk radio hosts
American women radio presenters
Year of birth missing (living people)
Living people